CyberTracker is software from a South African non-profit company, CyberTracker Conservation, that develops handheld data capture solutions.

The software was first developed as a way to allow illiterate animal trackers to communicate their environmental observations. A prototype was used in 2002 to record details of animals killed in an outbreak of ebola. It has since evolved to become a general purpose data capture and visualization system. However, it retains the ability to be used by illiterate and low-literate users.

CyberTracker's primary user base is wildlife biologists, conservationists and disaster relief workers.

References

External links
 CyberTracker web site
 Justin's CyberTracker Corner
 Learning to Track Like a Bushman, Wired
 Bazilchuk, Nancy. 2004. Backward compatible. Conservation in Practice 5(4):37-38.

Software companies of South Africa
South African inventions